Marko Maravič (born June 26, 1979) is a Slovenian professional basketball coach and former player. He currently serves as an assistant coach for Cedevita Olimpija of the Slovenian League, ABA League and the EuroCup.

Playing career
Maravic has played with Slovan (Slo), Royal BC Pepinster (Bel), Krka (Slo), Union Olimpija (Slo), AJ Milano (Ita), Manresa (Spa), Vive Menorca (Spa) and BC Kyiv (Ukr).

National team career
Maravič was a member of the Slovenia national basketball team at the 2005 FIBA European Championship.

References 
Eurobasket.com Profile

1979 births
Living people
ABA League players
Bàsquet Manresa players
BC Kyiv players
Élan Béarnais players
KD Slovan players
KK Krka players
KK Olimpija players
KK Cedevita Olimpija assistant coaches
Liga ACB players
Menorca Bàsquet players
Olimpia Milano players
RBC Pepinster players
Slovenian expatriate basketball people in Spain
Slovenian men's basketball players
Small forwards
Basketball players from Ljubljana